Papyrus Oxyrhynchus 5101, designated by 2227 (in the Alfred Ralhfs numbering of Greek Septuagint manuscripts) or P.Oxy.LXXVII 5101 (LDAB 140272) is a manuscript of the Psalms in the Greek Septuagint version, written on papyrus in roll form. It has survived in only a few fragments. Using the study of comparative writings styles (palaeography), it has been dated to between 50 and 150 CE.

It uses the Tetragrammaton (name of God in the Hebrew Bible) written in palaeo-Hebrew script instead substituting the Greek title , and is currently the earliest extant copy of the Septuagint Psalms.

Description 
The manuscript was originally a papyrus roll, of which fragments from six columns have survived. The fragments contain Psalms 26:9-14; 44:4-8; 47:13-15; 48:6-21; 49:2-16; 63:6-64:5 according to the numbering of the Septuagint (the Hebrew Bible Psalms number them slightly differently). According to biblical scholar Larry Hurtado, “[t]his is probably the earliest extant copy of the Septuagint Psalms.” The text was written by an inexperienced writer in uncial script characters.

The manuscript contains the tetragrammaton to represent the Divine Name of God (YHWH) written in the palaeo-Hebrew script.

History 
The manuscript was discovered at Oxyrhynchus (Egypt), and has been catalogued with number P. Oxy 5101. The manuscript has been given an Alfred Rahlfs number of 2227 in the list of Septuagint manuscripts. The fragments were published in 2011 by Danielę Colomo and W.B. Henry in The Oxyrhynchus Papyri, vol LXXVII (77).

The manuscript is currently housed in the Papyrology section of the Sackler Library at Oxford (shelf number 20 3B.36/J(4)B + 27 3B.38/N(1)B + 27 3B.41/J(1-2)c).

References

Bibliography

External links 
 

1st-century biblical manuscripts
2nd-century biblical manuscripts
5101
Psalms
Septuagint manuscripts